

References

      

Chemical data pages
Chemical data pages cleanup